Henry Cecil Dudgeon D'Arcy VC (11 August 1850 – 1881) was a New Zealand-born recipient of the Victoria Cross, the highest and most prestigious award for gallantry in the face of the enemy that can be awarded to British and Commonwealth forces. He won the VC on 3 July 1879 at Ulundi in South Africa during the Anglo-Zulu War when he was 28 years old, and a captain in the Frontier Light Horse.

Early life

D'Arcy was born in Wanganui, New Zealand, where his father Major Oliver Barker D'Arcy (sometimes D'Arcey) of the 65th Regiment was in the British garrison. In 1860, Oliver D'Arcy transferred to the Cape Mounted Riflemen and settled with his family at King William's Town in the Cape Colony.

Anglo-Zulu War

During the Anglo-Zulu War of 1879, Cecil D'Arcy was an officer in the Frontier Light Horse, a mounted unit of 200 volunteers raised at King William's Town in 1877 by Lieutenant Frederick Carrington.

At the Battle of Hlobane on 28 March 1879, his unit acted as the rearguard and 20% of the 156 members were killed. D'Arcy was recommended for the VC by Evelyn Wood for going back to save the lives of wounded men in the descent of Devil's Pass; the award was not approved on the grounds that he was a volunteer and not a member of the imperial forces. Five other awards were approved, including to Colonel Redvers Buller; he had rescued D'Arcy who was retiring on foot and carrying him on his horse, while hotly pursued by Zulus.

At the Battle of Kambula on the following day, the Frontier Light Horse were part of the pursuit of the retreating Zulu forces. Captain D'Arcy wrote in a letter published in The Natal Mercury in April that they "followed them for eight miles, butchering the brutes all over the place. I told the men, 'No quarter, boys, and remember yesterday'. And they did knock them about, killing them all over the place". The FLH troopers extracted their revenge for their comrades killed the day before at Hlobane.

He was awarded the VC for his actions on 3 July 1879 when a mounted reconnaissance was ambushed near Ulundi. In a dispatch dated 5 July in The London Gazette, Redvers Buller wrote that D'Arcy "reckons neither personal inconvenience nor danger in the execution of any order, determined and bold; he has frequently shown great personal gallantry, and has always given a fine example to his men." The citation of the VC award reads;

He was presented with his medal in December 1879 by Sir Garnet Wolseley in Pretoria.

Further information

After the Frontier Light Horse was disbanded, D'Arcy joined the Cape Mounted Riflemen as a captain. He served in the 1880 Basuto Gun War, but resigned his commission in April 1881.

In ill health, he stayed with Rev. Charles Taberer in Keiskammahoek to recuperate. During the night of 6–7 August 1881 he left the house; his body was not found for several months. He was interred on 3 January 1882 in the cemetery of King William's Town beside his parents.

He is also considered South African, though he probably considered himself British or Anglo-Irish.

Speculation

In 2008, David Randall in The Independent newspaper in London reported claims that D'Arcy faked his death.

See also

Edmund O'Toole
Lord William Beresford; both won the VC on 3 July 1879 at Ulundi during the retirement of a reconnoitring party.

References

External links

  (brief biography details)

1850 births
1881 deaths
Anglo-Zulu War recipients of the Victoria Cross
Cape Colony army officers
New Zealand recipients of the Victoria Cross
People from Qonce
People from Whanganui
South African recipients of the Victoria Cross
People of the Basuto Gun War